George Ford may refer to:

Sports
 George Ford (cricketer) (1817–1848), English cricketer and clergyman
 George Ford (coach) (1871–1941), American football player and coach
 George Ford (footballer) (1891–?), English amateur football left back
 George Ford (baseball), American baseball player
 George Ford (ice hockey) (born 1930), Canadian ice hockey player
 George Ford (rugby union) (born 1993), English rugby union player
 George Ford (water polo) (born 1993), Australian water polo player

Others
 George Samuel Ford (1790–1868), bill discounter and solicitor
 George Henry Ford (1808–1876), South African natural history illustrator
 George W. Ford (1844–1883), Irish soldier who fought in the American Civil War
 George Ford (American politician) (1846–1917), American politician and judge
 George Alfred Ford (1851–1928), American missionary in Syria and Lebanon
 George Barry Ford (1885–1978), American Roman Catholic priest, theologian, and social activist
 George Ford (Australian politician) (1907–1966), Australian politician and unionist
 George Ford (illustrator), American illustrator